Uckermark – Barnim I is an electoral constituency (German: Wahlkreis) represented in the Bundestag. It elects one member via first-past-the-post voting. Under the current constituency numbering system, it is designated as constituency 57. It is located in northeastern Brandenburg, comprising the Uckermark district and most of the Barnim district.

Uckermark – Barnim I was created for the inaugural 1990 federal election after German reunification. Since 2021, it has been represented by Stefan Zierke of the Social Democratic Party (SPD).

Geography
Uckermark – Barnim I is located in northeastern Brandenburg. As of the 2021 federal election, it comprises the district of Uckermark and the district of Barnim excluding the municipalities of Ahrensfelde, Bernau bei Berlin, Panketal, and Werneuchen.

History
Uckermark – Barnim I was created after German reunification in 1990, then known as Prenzlau – Angermünde – Schwedt – Templin – Gransee. It acquired its current name in the 2002 election. In the 1990 through 1998 elections, it was constituency 272 in the numbering system. In the 2002 and 2005 elections, it was number 57. In the 2009 election, it was number 58. Since the 2013 election, it has been number 57.

Originally, the constituency comprised the independent city of Schwedt and the districts of Prenzlau, Angermünde, Templin, and Gransee. It acquired its current configuration in the 2002 election, as Schwedt, Angermünde, Prenzlau, and Templin were merged into the Uckermark district. It lost Gransee while acquiring the northern part of the new Barnim district, as well as the entirety of the Amt of Groß Schönebeck. Upon the abolition of Amt Groß Schönebeck ahead of the 2005 election, the municipality of Marienwerder and the former municipality of Zerpenschleuse were transferred out of the constituency. In the 2013 election, it gained the municipality of Wandlitz and the Amt of Biesenthal-Barnim.

Members
The constituency was first represented by Markus Meckel of the Social Democratic Party (SPD) from 1990 to 2009. It was won by The Left in 2009, and represented by Sabine Stüber. In 2013, it was won by Jens Koeppen of the Christian Democratic Union (CDU). He was re-elected in 2017. Stefan Zierke regained it for the SPD in 2021.

Election results

2021 election

2017 election

2013 election

2009 election

References

Federal electoral districts in Brandenburg
1990 establishments in Germany
Constituencies established in 1990